KRI Sultan Iskandar Muda (367) is a Diponegoro-class corvette of the Indonesian Navy.

Development 

The Diponegoro-class guided-missile corvettes of the Indonesian Navy are SIGMA 9113 types of the Netherlands-designed Sigma family of modular naval vessels, named after Indonesian Prince Diponegoro. Currently there are 4 Diponegoro-class corvette in service.

Construction and career 
Sultan Iskandar Muda was laid down on 8 May 2006 and launched on 24 November 2007 by Damen Group, Vlissingen. She was commissioned on 18 October 2008.

Gallery

References

2007 ships
Diponegoro-class corvettes